Silver Threads Among the Gold is a popular American song from 1873. 

Silver Threads Among the Gold may also refer to:

Silver Threads Among the Gold (1911 film), directed by Edwin S. Porter
Silver Threads Among the Gold (1915 film), starring countertenor Richard Jose